Pan Li-chun (born 26 February 1982 in Kaohsiung) is a Taiwanese table tennis player. As of July 2012, Pan is ranked no. 168 in the world by the International Table Tennis Federation (ITTF). Pan is a member of the table tennis team for Taiwan Cooperative Bank, and is coached and trained by Hsu Long-Chien. Pan is also right-handed, and uses the shakehand grip.

Pan represented the Chinese Taipei at the 2008 Summer Olympics in Beijing, where she competed in the women's singles. She defeated Egypt's Shaimaa Abdul-Aziz in the unseeded preliminary round, before losing out the first round match to Turkey's Melek Hu, with a set score of 1–4.

References

External links
 
 NBC 2008 Olympics profile

1982 births
Living people
Taiwanese female table tennis players
Table tennis players at the 2008 Summer Olympics
Olympic table tennis players of Taiwan
Sportspeople from Kaohsiung
Table tennis players at the 2002 Asian Games
Asian Games competitors for Chinese Taipei
21st-century Taiwanese women